According to traditional Chinese uranography, the modern constellation Capricornus is located within the northern quadrant of the sky, which is symbolized as the Black Tortoise of the North (北方玄武, Běi Fāng Xuán Wǔ)

The name of the western constellation in modern Chinese is 摩羯座 (mó jié zuò), meaning "the rub ram constellation".

Stars
The map of Chinese constellation in constellation Capricornus area consists of :

See also
Traditional Chinese star names
Chinese constellations

References

External links
Capricornus – Chinese associations
香港太空館研究資源
中國星區、星官及星名英譯表
天象文學
台灣自然科學博物館天文教育資訊網
中國古天文
中國古代的星象系統

Astronomy in China
Capricornus (constellation)